USS Ticonderoga may refer to:

  was a 17-gun schooner in service from 1814 to 1825
  was a screw sloop-of-war in commission from 1863 to 1881
  was a former German cargo ship that served the Naval Overseas Transportation Service during World War I in 1917 and 1918
  was a long-hull  fleet aircraft carrier which served from 1944 to 1973
  was a guided missile cruiser and lead ship of her class. Launched in 1981, she was decommissioned on 30 September 2004

United States Navy ship names